The Minnesota Lynx are an American professional basketball team based in Minneapolis, playing in the Western Conference in the Women's National Basketball Association (WNBA). The team won the WNBA title in 2011, 2013, 2015, and 2017.

Founded prior to the 1999 season, the team is owned by Glen Taylor, who is also the majority owner of the Lynx' NBA counterpart, the Minnesota Timberwolves. The franchise has been home to players such as Katie Smith, Seimone Augustus, native Minnesotan Lindsay Whalen, Maya Moore, Rebekkah Brunson, and Sylvia Fowles.

The Lynx have qualified for the WNBA playoffs in twelve of their twenty-one years. They currently hold a WNBA record ten consecutive playoff appearances.

Franchise history

Joining the league (1998–2004)
On April 22, 1998, the WNBA announced they would add two expansion teams (Minnesota and the Orlando Miracle) for the 1999 season. The team was officially named the Minnesota Lynx on December 5, 1998. The Lynx started their inaugural season in 1999 with 12,122 fans in attendance to watch the first regular-season game against the Detroit Shock at Target Center. The Lynx defeated Detroit 68–51 in the franchise's first game. They finished their first season 15–17 overall and held the same record in 2000.

In 2001, the Lynx took a turn for the worse as they posted a 12–20 record.

The Lynx' first head coach, Brian Agler, was released during the 2002 season after compiling a 47–67 record in three-plus seasons. Heidi VanDerveer became the interim head coach for the remainder of the season. The team finished the 2002 season with a 10–22 record, worst in franchise history (until 2006).

In 2003, the Lynx hired Suzie McConnell-Serio as head coach. She led the team to finish with a franchise-best 18–16 record and advanced to the WNBA Playoffs for the first time. They matched both of these feats in the 2004 season.

Seimone Augustus joins the team (2005–2007)

The 2005 season was one of transition for the franchise.  Leading scorer Katie Smith was dealt to Detroit in July and the team stumbled down the stretch, missing the playoffs for the first time in three years.  The poor finish did pay off however, as the team won the draft lottery and selected All-American guard Seimone Augustus of Louisiana State University with the first overall pick in the 2006 WNBA Draft.

The Lynx began the 2006 season as the youngest team in the WNBA. On May 31, the team set the WNBA single-game scoring record (at the time), routing the Los Angeles Sparks by a score of 114–71. Despite this victory and with her team floundering to an 8–15 record, head coach McConnell-Serio resigned on July 23.  She was replaced by assistant Carolyn Jenkins, who piloted the squad to a 2–9 finish. The team's 24 losses set a franchise record.

Following the season, Augustus was named the 2006 WNBA Rookie of the Year. Her 21.9 points per game is still a WNBA rookie record.  The 22-year-old was the second player in team history to win the award.

On December 13, 2006, the Lynx named veteran NBA assistant Don Zierden their fifth head coach.

In the 2007 WNBA Draft, the Lynx traded center Tangela Smith, whom they acquired in the dispersal draft from the Charlotte Sting, to the Phoenix Mercury for point guard Lindsey Harding, who had been selected first overall.

The Lynx began the 2007 season 0–7, lost ten straight in July and failed to get into the playoff race. They finished tying a league-worst 10–24 record. On November 1, 2007, assistant coach and former head coach Carolyn Jenkins was named Director of Player Personnel of the WNBA.

Hot starts without results (2008–2009)
The 2008 season started out much different for the Lynx than in previous years. They came flying out of the gates, going 7–1 in the first five weeks of the season. The Lynx then cooled off. They managed to play competitive basketball all season, but lost many key games down the stretch. The Lynx finished with a 16–18 record in a tough Western Conference where every team was in the playoff chase until the final week of the season. The Lynx however, did not qualify. After two consecutive 10–24 seasons, the 2008 Lynx was a step in the right direction.

In 2009, Zierden resigned just days before the start of the season. Jennifer Gillom who replaced Teresa Edwards as an assistant coach the previous year, was promoted to head coach. Another Zierden Lynx assistant, former NBA player Jim Petersen stayed with Gillom during the season, working with post players Charde Houston and Nicky Anosike. The Lynx saw similar results in 2008. They started with a good run (7–3), but lost many key games, including a six-game losing streak, and finished 14–20, out from the playoffs for the fifth straight season.

A new team and the first championship (2010–2011)

After five disappointing seasons, the off-season brought much more impact to the franchise. The team hired former Detroit Shock assistant coach Cheryl Reeve as their new head coach, parting ways with Jennifer Gillom, who took the head coaching job of the Los Angeles Sparks. The Lynx also made some moves in the off-season by selecting Rebekkah Brunson in the Sacramento Monarchs dispersal draft, and trading their first overall pick of the 2010 WNBA Draft and Renee Montgomery to the Connecticut Sun for former Minnesota Gopher Lindsay Whalen and the second overall pick. They added free agent Hamchétou Maïga to the lineup, and selected University of Virginia guard Monica Wright with the second pick in the 2010 Draft. With these off-season transactions, the Lynx looked forward to a much improved 2010 season, which was echoed by the eighth annual WNBA general manager poll – 45% of the general managers declared the Lynx the most-improved team as the 2010 season began.

The selection of Maya Moore during the 2011 WNBA Draft led many people to believe the Lynx to be championship contenders for the 2011 season. The team finally lived up to expectations in 2011, behind stellar play from Seimone Augustus, Rebekkah Brunson, Moore, and Whalen, all of whom were named to the 2011 Western Conference All-Star Team. The Lynx went into the All-Star break with a 10–4 record, good for first place in the conference. After losing to Phoenix in a 112–105 contest at Target Center on July 13, the Lynx went on a nine-game winning streak, at the time a franchise record and the longest in the league for 2011. The team finished with a 27–7 record, best in the WNBA and in team history.

The Lynx earned the top overall seed in the 2011 WNBA Playoffs. In the first round, they defeated the San Antonio Silver Stars two-games-to-one in the best of three series. The Lynx then swept the Phoenix Mercury in two games to win their first conference championship. In the Finals, the Lynx trailed at halftime in each game, but rallied each time to sweep the Atlanta Dream in three games, securing their first WNBA title, and the first professional championship for the state of Minnesota since the Minnesota Twins won the World Series in 1991. Seimone Augustus was named Finals MVP.

Road to more championships (2012–2017)

In 2012, the team began the season 10–0, a franchise and league record. They clinched a playoff berth on August 19, 2012, just 21 games into the season. The team fell to the Indiana Fever in the 2012 WNBA Finals.

The Lynx used both the loss in the Finals and prognosticators' pre-season focus on the Phoenix Mercury's new phenom, Brittney Griner, to motivate themselves for the 2013 season. The Lynx once again had the best record in the West. They completed their comeback, sweeping through the playoffs en route to their second championship in three years, once again defeating the Atlanta Dream. Maya Moore, showing why she's now a superstar in the WNBA, won the 2013 WNBA Finals MVP. In doing so, the Lynx became the second WNBA team and fifth major professional sports franchise to sweep through the postseason.

In 2014, the Lynx again had a successful regular season, claiming the second best record in the league, second only to Griner and the Mercury. However, in the playoffs, the Mercury bested them 2–1 in a three-game series, and the Lynx failed to make the finals for the first time since the 2010 season.

In 2015, two-time Defensive Player of the Year Sylvia Fowles of the Chicago Sky held out of her contract until her wish was granted in July to play for Minnesota. The Lynx would go on to win their third franchise title, all three of them in a five-year span dating back to 2011. Fowles proved herself to be a crucial addition, earning finals MVP honors.

After winning the WNBA title in 2015, the Lynx qualified to the 2016 WNBA Playoffs as the top seed with a franchise record 28–6 finish, only entering in the semifinals to face the Phoenix Mercury. Due to the Target Center entering a renovation, the team moved to the Xcel Energy Center in Saint Paul, where the Lynx played the 2017 regular season. A sweep of the Mercury qualified the Lynx for their fifth finals in six years, with the adversary being the Los Angeles Sparks.  The Lynx would not repeat their title, as the Sparks edged out the Lynx in a five-game series, eventually winning game 5 by 1 point.

On August 12, 2017, the Lynx set two WNBA records in their 111–52 defeat of the Indiana Fever: largest margin of victory (59 points) and longest unanswered scoring run (37 consecutive points). The Lynx finished as the top seed in the league, finishing 27–7. In the semi-finals, the Lynx defeated the Washington Mystics in a three-game sweep to advance to the WNBA Finals for the sixth time in seven years. The Lynx avenged 2016's Finals loss to the Sparks by defeating them in five games to win their fourth championship in seven seasons and tying the now-defunct Houston Comets for most WNBA championship titles.

End of a dynasty (2018-present)

In 2018, with back-up point guard Renee Montgomery leaving in free agency to sign with the Atlanta Dream and a now aging roster intact, the Lynx would start falling way short of championship contention. Although Moore, Fowles, Augustus and Brunson made All-Star appearances, the Lynx finished as the number 7 seed in the league with an 18–16 record. This was the first time in 8 years where the Lynx did not finish as a top 2 seed. Lindsay Whalen also announced her retirement prior to the playoffs. The Lynx started off their playoff run against the rival Los Angeles Sparks in the first round elimination game. They lost 75–68, ending their run of three consecutive Finals appearances, and it was Whalen's final career game.

In 2019 and 2020, however, the Lynx would produce players that won WNBA Rookie of the Year.

Uniforms
The home uniforms are white with blue and silver trim. The team jerseys bear the logo of the team's jersey sponsor, the Mayo Clinic, in blue. The road uniforms are blue with silver and white trim and the sponsor logo written in silver. The Lynx previously used an Adidas uniform that was standard throughout the league, but the WNBA partnered with Nike, Inc. for eight years beginning in 2018. The Lynx are also one of 11 WNBA teams sponsored by Verizon, whose logo is also prominently featured on their uniforms.

During the 2016 season, the white uniforms were temporarily replaced by a new silver uniform. This was part of a league-wide initiative for its 20th season, in which all games featured all-color uniform matchups.

Lynx Foundation
The Minnesota Lynx Foundation holds an annual "Catwalk for a Cure" event at the Mall of America during the WNBA's Breast Health Awareness Week to raise funds for breast cancer related charities. The 2011 event was held Aug. 5 and raised $5,000 for Susan G. Komen for the Cure.

In 2012, the Lynx hosted the Catwalk for a Cure at the Mall of America rotunda for the first time, occupying the largest staging area inside the country's biggest mall. In addition to displaying outfits, Lynx players ended the show with a dance based on the song "Background" by Lecrae and Andy Mineo. The Lynx Foundation donated a $5,000 grant to the SAGE program, run by the Minnesota Department of Health.

During the WNBA's 2013 Breast Health Awareness Week and in partnership with the Edith Sanford Breast Cancer Foundation, the Lynx game against the Indiana Fever on August 25 was a "Pink Out" game at Target Center and on August 29, the 5th annual "Catwalk for a Cure" event was held at the Mall of America. The Lynx donated a $10,000 grant to the Edith Sanford Breast Cancer Foundation.

Season-by-season records

Players

Roster

Other rights owned

FIBA Hall of Fame

Retired numbers

Team officials

Owners
Glen Taylor, owner of the Minnesota Timberwolves (1999–present)

Head coaches

President of Basketball Operations
Cheryl Reeve (2022-Present)

General managers
Brian Agler (1999–2002)
Roger Griffith (2003–2017)
Cheryl Reeve (2018–2022)
Clare Duwelius (2022-Present)

Assistant coaches
Heidi VanDerveer (1999–2001)
Kelly Kramer (1999–2002)
Nancy Darsch (2003–2005)
Carolyn Jenkins (2003–2005, 2007)
Jim Lewis (2006)
Susan Yow (2006)
Teresa Edwards (2007)
Ed Prohofsky (2007–2008)
Jennifer Gillom (2008)
Julie Plank (2008)
Jim Davis (2009)
Jim Petersen (2009–2016)
Shelley Patterson (2010–2019)
James Wade (2017–2018)
Walt Hopkins (2017–2019)
Plenette Pierson (2019–2022)
Katie Smith (2020–present)
Rebekkah Brunson (2020–present)
Kristin Haynie (2023-present)

Statistics

|-
! style="width:8%;"|PPG
! style="width:8%;"|RPG
! style="width:8%;"|APG
! style="width:8%;"|PPG
! style="width:8%;"|RPG
! style="width:8%;"|FG%
|-
| 1999
| B. Reed (16.4)
| B. Reed (6.0)
| Sonja Tate|S. Tate (3.1)
| 63.6 vs 66.0
| 28.3 vs 32.1
| .389 vs .425
|-

|-
! style="width:8%;"|PPG
! style="width:8%;"|RPG
! style="width:8%;"|APG
! style="width:8%;"|PPG
! style="width:8%;"|RPG
! style="width:8%;"|FG%
|-
| 2000
| K. Smith (20.2)
| B. Lennox (5.6)
| K. Smith (2.8)
| 68.5 vs 68.4
| 27.2 vs 30.5
| .421 vs .429
|-
| 2001
| K. Smith (23.1)
| S. Abrosimova (6.7)
| K. Paye (3.0)
| 64.9 vs 67.4
| 31.3 vs 31.8
| .371 vs .390
|-
| 2002
| K. Smith (16.5)
| T. Williams (7.4)
| T. Moore (3.0)
| 62.6 vs 65.8
| 30.0 vs 28.6
| .410 vs .413
|-
| 2003
| K. Smith (18.2)
| T. Williams (6.1)
| T. Edwards (4.4)
| 70.0 vs 69.7
| 31.7 vs 29.1
| .442 vs .425
|-
| 2004
| K. Smith (18.8)
| T. Williams (6.0)
| H. Darling (3.5)
| 63.7 vs 64.4
| 31.1 vs 30.5
| .404 vs .408
|-
| 2005
| N. Ohlde (11.2)
| N. Ohlde (5.7)
| K. Harrower (2.8)
| 65.0 vs 67.3
| 30.1 vs 31.0
| .412 vs .427
|-
| 2006
| S. Augustus (21.9)
| T. Williams (5.6)
| A. Jacobs (3.4)
| 74.2 vs 80.4
| 33.6 vs 35.4
| .427 vs .434
|-
| 2007
| S. Augustus (22.6)
| N. Ohlde (6.1)
| N. Quinn (4.4)
| 77.5 vs 80.9
| 34.8 vs 32.9
| .412 vs .450
|-
| 2008
| S. Augustus (19.1)
| N. Anosike (6.8)
| L. Harding (3.2)
| 81.4 vs 80.0
| 33.7 vs 35.6
| .430 vs .439
|-
| 2009
| N. Anosike (13.2)
| N. Anosike (7.4)
| N. Anosike (2.7)
| 80.3 vs 83.1
| 32.0 vs 34.3
| .420 vs .461
|-

|-
! style="width:8%;"|PPG
! style="width:8%;"|RPG
! style="width:8%;"|APG
! style="width:8%;"|PPG
! style="width:8%;"|RPG
! style="width:8%;"|FG%
|-
| 2010
| S. Augustus (16.9)
| R. Brunson (10.3)
| L. Whalen (5.6)
| 78.7 vs 82.1
| 35.2 vs 34.9
| .397 vs .446
|-
| 2011
| S. Augustus (16.2)
| R. Brunson (8.9)
| L. Whalen (5.9)
| 81.5 vs 73.6
| 36.5 vs 30.1
| .461 vs .413
|-
| 2012
| S. Augustus (16.6)
| R. Brunson (8.9)
| L. Whalen (5.4)
| 86.0 vs 76.2
| 37.8 vs 30.9
| .473 vs .407
|-
| 2013
| M. Moore (18.5)
| R. Brunson (8.9)
| L. Whalen (5.8)
| 82.9 vs 73.5
| 36.9 vs 32.2
| .474 vs .405
|-
| 2014
| M. Moore (23.9)
| R. Brunson (8.2)
| L. Whalen (5.5)
| 81.6 vs 77.2
| 35.2 vs 32.6
| .467 vs .423
|-
| 2015
| M. Moore (20.6)
| S. Fowles (8.3)
| L. Whalen (4.2)
| 75.5 vs 71.7
| 35.3 vs 33.1
| .441 vs .414
|-
| 2016
| M. Moore (19.3)
| S. Fowles (8.5)
| M. Moore (4.2)
| 85.8 vs 77.0
| 35.8 vs 30.7
| .471 vs .417
|-
|2017
| S. Fowles (18.9)
| S. Fowles (10.4)
| L. Whalen (4.1)
| 85.4 vs 74.2
| 35.2 vs 30.2
| .478 vs .424
|-
|2018
| M. Moore (18.0)
| S. Fowles (11.9)
| D. Robinson (3.3)
| 78.9 vs 78.3
| 35.3 vs 31.1
| .451 vs .445
|-
|2019
| O. Sims (14.5)
| S. Fowles (8.9)
| O. Sims (5.4)
| 78.4 vs 75.9
| 34.0 vs 31.1
| .451 vs .434
|-

|-
! style="width:8%;"|PPG
! style="width:8%;"|RPG
! style="width:8%;"|APG
! style="width:8%;"|PPG
! style="width:8%;"|RPG
! style="width:8%;"|FG%
|-
| 2020
| C. Dangerfield (16.2)
| S. Fowles (9.7)
| C. Dangerfield (3.6)
| 84.4 vs 80.6
| 34.4 vs 30.9
| .456 vs .447
|-
| 2021
| N. Collier (16.2)
| S. Fowles (10.1)
| L. Clarendon (5.7)
| 82.7 vs 78.7
| 34.9 vs 32.5
| .458 vs .424
|-
| 2022
| S. Fowles & A. Powers (14.4)
| S. Fowles (9.8)
| M. Jefferson (4.9)
| 82.4 vs 83.9
| 36.9 vs 32.4
| .450 vs .439

Media coverage
Lynx games are broadcast on either Bally Sports North or Bally Sports North Plus. Broadcasters for the Lynx television games are Marney Gellner and Lea B. Olsen. Lynx games are carried on Bob 106.1 FM; John Focke broadcasts radio games (and LiveAccess feeds).

All games (excluding blackout games, which are available on ESPN3.com) are broadcast to the WNBA LiveAccess game feeds on the league website. Furthermore, some Lynx games are broadcast nationally on ESPN, ESPN2 and ABC. The WNBA has reached an eight-year agreement with ESPN, which will pay right fees to the Lynx, as well as other teams in the league.

All-time notes

Regular season attendance
A sellout for a basketball game at Target Center is 18,798.
A sellout for a basketball game at Xcel Energy Center is 17,954.

Arenas
Target Center 1999–2016, 2018–present
Williams Arena 2007 one regular season game, 2017 playoffs
Xcel Energy Center 2016 Semi Final playoffs, 2017 regular season

Draft picks
1999 Expansion Draft: Brandy Reed (1), Kim Williams (3), Octavia Blue (5), Adia Barnes (7)
1999: Tonya Edwards (7), Trisha Fallon (19), Andrea Lloyd (31), Sonja Tate (43), Angie Potthoff (49)
2000: Grace Daley (5), Betty Lennox (6), Maylana Martin (10), Marla Brumfield (22), Keitha Dickerson (24), Phylesha Whaley (38), Jana Lichnerova (54), Shanele Stires (56)
2001: Svetlana Abrosimova (7), Erin Buescher (23), Tombi Bell (39), Megan Taylor (55)
2002: Tamika Williams (6), Lindsey Meder (38), Shárron Francis (54)
2003 Miami/Portland Dispersal Draft: Sheri Sam (2)
2003: Teresa Edwards (14), Carla Bennett (29)
2004 Cleveland Dispersal Draft: Helen Darling (7)
2004: Nicole Ohlde (6), Vanessa Hayden (7), Tasha Butts (20), Amber Jacobs (33)
2005: Kristen Mann (11), Jacqueline Batteast (17), Monique Bivins (37)
2006: Seimone Augustus (1), Shona Thorburn (7), Megan Duffy (31)
2007 Charlotte Dispersal Draft: Tangela Smith (2)
2007: Noelle Quinn (4), Eshaya Murphy (15), Brooke Smith (23), Kathrin Ress (24)
2008: Candice Wiggins (3), Nicky Anosike (16), Charde Houston (30)
2009 Houston Dispersal Draft: Roneeka Hodges (4)
2009: Renee Montgomery (4), Quanitra Hollingsworth (9), Rashanda McCants (15), Emily Fox (30)
2010 Sacramento Dispersal Draft: Rebekkah Brunson (2)
2010: Monica Wright (2), Kelsey Griffin (3), Gabriela Marginean (26)
2011: Maya Moore (1), Amber Harris (4), Jessica Breland (13), Kachine Alexander (26)
2012: Devereaux Peters (3), Damiris Dantas (12), Julie Wojta (18), Kayla Standish (19), Nika Baric (20), Jacki Gemelos (31)
2013: Lindsey Moore (12), Sugar Rodgers (14), Chucky Jeffery (24), Waltiea Rolle (36)
2014: Tricia Liston (12), Asya Bussie (15), Christina Foggie (24), Asia Taylor (36)
2015: Reshanda Gray (16), Shae Kelley (35)
2016: Jazmon Gwathmey (14), Bashaara Graves (22), Temi Fagbenle (35)
2017: Alexis Jones (12), Lisa Berkani (24), Tahlia Tupaea (36)
2018: Ji-Su Park (17), Kahlia Lawrence (24), Carlie Wagner (36)
2019: Napheesa Collier (6), Jessica Shepard (16), Natisha Hiedeman (18), Cierra Dillard (20), Kenisha Bell (30)
2020: Mikiah Herbert Harrigan (6), Crystal Dangerfield (16)
2021: Rennia Davis (9)
2022: Kayla Jones (22), Hannah Sjerven (28)

All-Stars
1999: Tonya Edwards
2000: Betty Lennox, Katie Smith
2001: Katie Smith
2002: Katie Smith
2003: Katie Smith
2004: Katie Smith
2005: Katie Smith
2006: Seimone Augustus
2007: Seimone Augustus
2008: No All-Star Game
2009: Nicky Anosike, Charde Houston
2010: Rebekkah Brunson, Lindsay Whalen
2011: Seimone Augustus, Rebekkah Brunson, Maya Moore, Lindsay Whalen
2012: No All-Star Game
2013: Seimone Augustus, Rebekkah Brunson, Maya Moore, Lindsay Whalen
2014: Seimone Augustus, Maya Moore, Lindsay Whalen
2015: Seimone Augustus, Maya Moore, Lindsay Whalen
2016: No All-Star Game
2017: Seimone Augustus, Rebekkah Brunson, Sylvia Fowles, Maya Moore
2018: Seimone Augustus, Rebekkah Brunson, Sylvia Fowles, Maya Moore
2019: Napheesa Collier, Sylvia Fowles, Odyssey Sims
2020: No All-Star Game
2021: Napheesa Collier, Sylvia Fowles
2022: Sylvia Fowles

Olympians
2000: Katie Smith, Kristi Harrower (AUS), Annie La Fleur (AUS)
2004: Katie Smith, Kristi Harrower (AUS), Nuria Martinez (ESP)
2008: Seimone Augustus, Nuria Martinez (ESP)
2012: Seimone Augustus, Maya Moore, Lindsay Whalen, Rachel Jarry (AUS), Damiris Dantas (BRA)
2016: Anna Cruz (ESP), Seimone Augustus, Sylvia Fowles, Maya Moore, Lindsay Whalen, Rachel Jarry (AUS)
2020: Napheesa Collier, Sylvia Fowles, Bridget Carleton (CAN), Natalie Achonwa (CAN)

Honors and awards

2000 Rookie of the Year: Betty Lennox
2000 All-WNBA Second Team: Katie Smith
2000 All-WNBA Second Team: Betty Lennox
2001 All-WNBA First Team: Katie Smith
2002 All-WNBA Second Team: Katie Smith
2003 All-WNBA First Team: Katie Smith
2004 Coach of the Year: Suzie McConnell Serio
2004 Kim Perrot Sportsmanship Award: Teresa Edwards
2006 Rookie of the Year: Seimone Augustus
2006 All-WNBA Second Team: Seimone Augustus
2006 All-Rookie Team: Seimone Augustus
2007 All-WNBA Second Team: Seimone Augustus
2008 Sixth Woman of the Year: Candice Wiggins
2008 All-Rookie Team: Nicky Anosike
2008 All-Rookie Team: Candice Wiggins
2009 All-Defensive First Team: Nicky Anosike
2009 All-Rookie Team: Renee Montgomery
2010 All-Defensive Second Team: Rebekkah Brunson
2010 All-Rookie Team: Monica Wright
2011 WNBA Finals Most Valuable Player: Seimone Augustus
2011 Rookie of the Year: Maya Moore
2011 Coach of the Year: Cheryl Reeve
2011 All-WNBA First Team: Lindsay Whalen
2011 All-WNBA Second Team: Seimone Augustus
2011 Peak Performer (Assists): Lindsay Whalen
2011 All-Defensive First Team: Rebekkah Brunson
2011 All-Rookie Team: Maya Moore
2012 Peak Performer (Assists): Lindsay Whalen
2012 All-WNBA First Team: Seimone Augustus
2012 All-WNBA Second Team: Lindsay Whalen
2012 All-WNBA Second Team: Maya Moore
2013 WNBA Finals Most Valuable Player: Maya Moore
2013 All-WNBA First Team: Maya Moore
2013 All-WNBA First Team: Lindsay Whalen
2013 All-WNBA Second Team: Seimone Augustus
2013 All-Defensive Second Team: Rebekkah Brunson
2014 Most Valuable Player: Maya Moore
2014 Peak Performer (Points): Maya Moore
2014 All-WNBA First Team: Maya Moore
2014 All-WNBA Second Team: Seimone Augustus
2014 All-WNBA Second Team: Lindsay Whalen
2014 All-Defensive Second Team: Maya Moore
2015 WNBA Finals Most Valuable Player: Sylvia Fowles
2015 All-WNBA First Team: Maya Moore
2016 Defensive Player of the Year: Sylvia Fowles
2016 Coach of the Year: Cheryl Reeve
2016 All-WNBA First Team: Maya Moore
2016 All-WNBA Second Team: Sylvia Fowles
2016 All-Defensive First Team: Sylvia Fowles
2017 Most Valuable Player: Sylvia Fowles
2017 All-WNBA First Team: Sylvia Fowles
2017 All-WNBA First Team: Maya Moore
2017 All-Defensive First Team: Sylvia Fowles
2017 All-Defensive Second Team: Rebekkah Brunson
2017 All-Defensive Second Team: Maya Moore
2017 WNBA Finals Most Valuable Player: Sylvia Fowles
2018 All-WNBA Second Team: Maya Moore
2018 All-Defensive Second Team: Rebekkah Brunson
2018 All-Defensive Second Team: Sylvia Fowles
2018 Peak Performer (Rebounds): Sylvia Fowles
2019 Rookie of the Year: Napheesa Collier
2019 All-WNBA First Team: Odyssey Sims
2019 All-Rookie Team: Napheesa Collier
2019 Executive of the Year: Cheryl Reeve
2020 Rookie of the Year: Crystal Dangerfield
2020 Coach of the Year: Cheryl Reeve
2020 All-Rookie Team: Crystal Dangerfield
2020 All-WNBA Second Team: Napheesa Collier
2020 All-Defensive Second Team: Napheesa Collier
2021 Defensive Player of the Year: Sylvia Fowles
2021 All-Defensive First Team: Sylvia Fowles
2021 All-WNBA Second Team: Sylvia Fowles
2022 Peak Performer (Rebounds): Sylvia Fowles
2022 Kim Perrot Sportsmanship Award: Sylvia Fowles
2022 All-Defensive First Team: Sylvia Fowles
2022 All-WNBA Second Team: Sylvia Fowles

Notes

References

External links

 

 
Women's National Basketball Association teams
Basketball teams established in 1998
Basketball teams in Minnesota
Sports in Minneapolis
1998 establishments in Minnesota